Chirodipterus is an extinct genus of lungfish which lived during the Devonian period. Fossils have been found in Australia.

Species

Chirodipterus australis
Chirodipterus paddyensis

References

External links
 Chirodipterus at The Digital Morphology library

Prehistoric lungfish genera
Devonian bony fish
Prehistoric fish of Australia